Malcidae is a family of true bugs in the order Hemiptera. There are at least 4 genera and more than 40 described species in Malcidae.

Genera
These three genera belong to the family Malcidae:
 Chauliops Scott, 1874
 Malcus Stal, 1859
 Neochauliops Stys, 1963
 † Eochauliops Camier, Logghe, Nel & Garrouste, 2019

References

Further reading

 
 
 

Lygaeoidea
Heteroptera families